Gençler Birliği SK is a sports club based in Trikomo, Northern Cyprus and first established in 1934 in Larnaca. For a small period the team's name was Demi Spor Larnaca.

References

Football clubs in Northern Cyprus
Sports clubs established in 1934